U.S. Città di Palermo played the season 2005-06 in the Serie A league, the second consecutive time since the 2004 promotion. During this season, Palermo also competed in the UEFA Cup, thus making its historical first appearance in a European competition.

Review and events

After having ended the 2004-05 Serie A campaign in sixth place, Palermo automatically qualified to the next UEFA Cup for an historical first time. Meanwhile, Francesco Guidolin resigned following the last matchday and Luigi Delneri was appointed to replace him. The summer market was heavily conditioned by the sale of powerful striker Luca Toni to Fiorentina for €10mln in a highly controversial move. Two young strikers, Andrea Caracciolo from Brescia and Stephen Makinwa from Atalanta, were signed as potential replacements for Toni.

Palermo had a good start in the season, showing a spectacular style of playing with impressive results, with an exciting 3-2 home win against Inter Milan as the highest point of the first half of the season. Palermo also successfully passed to the UEFA Cup group stage, after having defeated Cypriot side Anorthosis Famagusta FC in a 6-1 aggregate win. The club also succeeded to win its UEFA Cup round against the likes of RCD Espanyol, FC Lokomotiv Moscow, Maccabi Petah Tikva F.C. and Brøndby IF.

However, the initial successes were not repeated at the domestic one, as the team gradually lost touch with the top sides of the Serie A table. Despite intensive activity during the January football market, which brought David Di Michele, Federico Agliardi, Cristiano Lupatelli and Denis Godeas to the club, Palermo continued not to win matches, and a 3-1 home loss against Siena convinced Maurizio Zamparini to sack Delneri and replace him with Giuseppe Papadopulo. The new Palermo boss made an astonishing debut in a 3-0 home win to AC Milan in the quarter-finals of Coppa Italia, thus overturning the 1-0 defeat in the first leg and qualifying to the semi-finals of Coppa Italia with AS Roma as its opponent.

In the meanwhile Palermo also qualified to the UEFA Cup round of 16 after having defeated SK Slavia Praha. In the round of 16, Palermo challenged FC Schalke 04: a 1-0 home win in the first leg, with a goal by Franco Brienza, was followed by a 3-0 loss at Gelsenkirchen, with Palermo playing the whole second half in 10 players after team captain Eugenio Corini was sent off. Just six days after the UEFA Cup loss, Palermo won the first leg of the Coppa Italia semifinal over AS Roma by 2-1. The return match, played at the Stadio Olimpico of Rome on April 12, ended in a 1-0 win for AS Roma which eliminated the rosanero.

Palermo ended the season in eighth place, being initially qualified for the UEFA Intertoto Cup 2006. However, following the 2006 Serie A scandal, the team was admitted to play UEFA Cup for the next season.

Match results

Serie A

UEFA Cup

Coppa Italia

Player details

|-
|colspan="12"|Players sold or loaned out during the January transfer market:

|}

January transfer market bids
In

Out

References

Palermo F.C. seasons
Palermo